Iddaa League B 2006–07 is the 2006-2007 season of Iddaa League B.

First round

Group A

Group B

Group C

Group D

Group E

Second round

Classification groups

Group A

Group B

Group C

Group D

Group E

Promotion group

Third Round (Extra Play-Off)
All matches were played at Bursa Atatürk Stadium.

Quarterfinals

Semifinals

Final

See also
2006–07 Süper Lig
2006–07 TFF First League
2006–07 TFF Third League

TFF Second League seasons
3
Turkey